is a Japanese politician of the Sunrise Party of Japan, a member of the House of Councillors in the Diet (national legislature). A native of Hiroo District, Hokkaidō and dropout of Kanagawa University, he was elected to the House of Councillors as a candidate for the Liberal

Democratic Party for the first time in 1998 after serving in the prefectural assembly of Hokkaidō for five terms. He is the younger brother of Ichirō Nakagawa.

He joined the Sunrise Party of Japan on April 10, 2010, but lost in House of Councillors election.

References

External links 
 Official website in Japanese.

Members of the House of Councillors (Japan)
Living people
1938 births
Kanagawa University alumni
Members of the Hokkaido Prefectural Assembly
Liberal Democratic Party (Japan) politicians
Sunrise Party politicians
21st-century Japanese politicians